Gurjinder Singh (born 1 April 1994) is an Indian field hockey player who plays as a defender.

Gurjinder was the leading goal-scorer and player of the tournament of the 2012 World Series Hockey with 19 goals. The following year, he was picked for the national team for the first time for the FIH Hockey World League Round 2. He was part of the Indian junior squad at the 2013 Men's Hockey Junior World Cup and the senior squad at the 2014 Men's Hockey Champions Trophy.

References

1994 births
Living people
People from Gurdaspur district
Indian male field hockey players
Field hockey players from Punjab, India